The Dominican Summer League Guardians are a minor league baseball team in Boca Chica, Dominican Republic. They are a Rookie-level team in the Dominican Summer League and are an affiliate of the Cleveland Guardians. Since 2011, the DSL Guardians have played their home games at the Academia de Prospecto Complex in San Antonio de Guerra.

From 2017–2019, the then-Indians operated an additional club, the DSL Indians/Brewers, in partnership with the Milwaukee Brewers. As of 2020, the Guardians operate the second DSL club on their own.

Rosters

</noinclude>

References

External links
DSL Guardians
DSL Guardians/Brewers

Cleveland Guardians minor league affiliates
Baseball teams in the Dominican Republic
Dominican Summer League teams